Waianae High School is a public, coeducational secondary school in the City and County of Honolulu, Hawaii, United States, on the leeward (western) coast of the island of Oahu. Waianae High School is part of the Leeward School District, under the Hawaii State Department of Education.

Campus
The  campus is located at 85-251 Farrington Highway between two census-designated places (CDPs): Mākaha (to the north), and Waianae (to the south). It has a Wainae postal address. Waianae High School is situated on the coastline; the Pacific Ocean is directly west of the campus and Farrington Highway bordering on the east. This location makes it the only high school in the U.S. built on the beach.

The school's football field, which borders the shoreline, is named after the school's first principal, Raymond Torii. The school's annual commencement ceremony is usually held there.

The campus boasts the sculptures Kuikahi by Eli Marozzi and Four Valleys by Ken Shutt.

Academics
Waianae High initiated its self-contained career academy program in 2004. According to the school's website, the academies provide students work-based education in addition to a core college preparatory curriculum. Each of the four career academies has several hundred students enrolled. Groups of teachers serve in teams in each academy.

 Business/Industrial Education and Technology
 Health and Human Services
 Natural Resources
 Ninth Grade Success Academy
 Searider Productions Academy (formerly Arts & Communications Academy)

Notable alumni
Listed alphabetically by last name, with graduating class year in parentheses.

 Kurt Gouveia (1982) – professional football athlete
 Max Holloway (2010) – professional MMA fighter, former UFC Featherweight Champion
 Israel Kamakawiwoole (1977) – recording artist
 Yancy Medeiros – 3rd at Hawaii State Wrestling Championships; professional Mixed Martial Artist, current UFC Lightweight
 Raquel Paaluhi - professional Mixed Martial Artist, currently competing for Invicta FC
 Fiamalu Penitani aka Musashimaru (1989) – sumo wrestler

References

External links
 
 Waianae High School Alumni
 Searider Productions
 Waianae High School on Google Maps

Public high schools in Honolulu County, Hawaii
1957 establishments in Hawaii
Educational institutions established in 1957